Arthur McGovern (died 1942, at age 54) was a personal trainer to the titans of Broadway and Wall Street at his Madison Avenue gym.  A former flyweight boxer, he shot to fame by reconditioning Babe Ruth, who came out of a slump to hit 47 home runs next season, and a record 60 homers the next. Jack Dempsey, Gene Sarazen, John Philip Sousa and Paul Whiteman were among his other celebrity clients.

In December, 1925  Babe Ruth started working out at McGovern's gymnasium. He put Ruth on a rigorous program of diet, exercise and arid rest. There are photographs of McGovern working with Ruth in the August 1926 issue of the Physical Culture magazine, titled, "Brought Back By Physical Culture". McGovern has been described as a "prominent practitioner" of physical culture.

McGovern was also the author of a 1935 fitness book title The Secret of Keeping Fit. He died in Manhattan, New York.

References

External links
"How the Babe Got Fit," Parade, April 30, 2006
"Milestones," Time, November 9, 1942
Photo of Artie McGovern with Gene Tunney

Year of birth missing
1942 deaths
American exercise and fitness writers
American exercise instructors
People associated with physical culture